List of mountains in Bosnia and Herzegovina:

References 

 

Mountains in Bosnia and Herzegovina
 
Bosnia and Herzegovina
Mountains
Bos